The 2020 Utah Royals FC season marks the team's third year of existence and its third season in the National Women's Soccer League (NWSL), the top division of the American soccer pyramid.

On January 6, 2020 the team mutually parted ways with head coach Laura Harvey so she could take a position with U.S Soccer as the head coach for the U-20 Women's National Team.

Competitions
Due to the COVID-19 pandemic the NWSL did not hold a regular season as originally scheduled. The season was replaced by the 2020 NWSL Challenge Cup in July and the Fall Series in September and October.

2020 NWSL Challenge Cup
The Royals began their Challenge Cup against the Houston Dash on June 30. They were without forward Christen Press who opted out of the tournament and Desiree Scott who withdrew from the tournament due to personal reasons.

Challenge Cup Match Results
Preliminary Round

Knockout Round

Fall Series
The Royals would be without several players for the NWSL Fall Series. Forward Christen Press signed with Manchester United. Rachel Corsie went on loan to Birmingham City and Gunnhildur Jónsdóttir was loaned to Valur. Kelley O'Hara, Desiree Scott and Diana Matheson all opted out of the Fall Series.

Head Coach Craig Harrington and assistant coach Louis Lancaster were placed on administrative leave prior to the first game of the Fall Series, Amy LePeilbet was named interim head coach.

Fall Series Match Results

Club

Roster

 Age calculated as of the start of the 2020 Fall Series.

Player Transactions

Transfers In

Transfers Out

2020 NWSL College Draft

 Source: National Women's Soccer League

References

Utah Royals FC seasons
Utah Royals FC
Utah Royals FC
Utah Royals FC